Bugesera is a district (akarere) in Eastern Province, Rwanda. Its capital is Nyamata.

The district is the location of two memorial sites of the Rwandan genocide at Ntarama and Nyamata.

Geography 
Bugesera comprises areas south of Kigali, which were formerly in the Kigali Ngali province, around the town of Nyamata. 

The area is prone to droughts as it has a higher average daytime temperature than the Rwandan average, and lower precipitation.  

It is the construction site for a new international airport to serve Kigali, 40 km away, and the rest of the nation, replacing Kigali International Airport in the future.

Sectors 
Bugesera district is divided into 15 sectors (imirenge): Gashora, Juru, Kamabuye, Ntarama, Mareba, Mayange, Musenyi, Mwogo, Ngeruka, Nyamata, Nyarugenge, Rilima, Ruhuha, Rweru and Shyara.

External links 
 
 Bugesera District government website

 
Eastern Province, Rwanda
Districts of Rwanda